Mohamed Noah bin Omar (Jawi: محمد نوح بن عمر‎; 13 August 1897 – 6 September 1991)  was a Malaysian politician. He was one of the leading figures who founded the United Malays National Organisation (UMNO) and became the first Speaker of the Dewan Rakyat.

Early life
Noah Omar was born in Bandar Maharani, Muar, Johor on 13 August 1897. He is a descendant of the 17th century Bugis Raja Chempa. His ancestors were the aristocratic Orang Kaya of Muar. He attended the Syrian Protestant College in Beirut, Lebanon, after which he acquired the nickname "Noah Beirut". After returning, he worked as a lorry driver and clerk before joining the Johor civil service.

Noah married twice in a polygamous manner, firstly to Maimun Abdul Manaf (1903–1968) in 1921 until her death and then to Siti Amirah Kusuma (1916–2014). His children from his first marriage are Rahah, the widow of Tun Abdul Razak, who was 2nd Prime Minister from 1970 to 1976, Suhaila, the widow of Tun Hussein Onn, who was 3rd Prime Minister from 1976 to 1981, and Fakhriah who married Abdullah Ahmad, a member of the Johor royal court. Their grandsons, Najib Abdul Razak became the 6th Prime Minister, while Hishamuddin Hussein became a cabinet minister of different portfolios and is one of the leading UMNO leaders since the 1990s. Noah and Siti Amirah had an elder child, Nabiha, who died at a young age. Noah had only one son, Abu Rais, who died at his early age of 40. Siti Amirah Kusuma died on 17 July 2014 in Malaysia Airlines Flight 17 (MH17) tragedy at Donetsk Oblast, Ukraine.

Career

Politics
Noah was very active in the Malayan nationalist movement along with his contemporaries, Onn Jaafar, Haji Anwar bin Abdul Malik and Haji Syed Alwi bin Syed Sheikh al-Hadi. Together they founded UMNO on 1 May 1946 as a means to rally the Malays against the Malayan Union, which was perceived as threatening Malay privileges and the position of the Malay rulers.

After independence, he became the first Speaker of the Dewan Rakyat, the lower house of Parliament between 1959 and 1964. Subsequently, he was President of the Dewan Negara, the upper house, from 1968 to 1970.

Business
Noah together with Tan Sri Lim Goh Tong formed a private company called Genting Highlands Berhad (now Genting Group), which was set up on 27 April 1965 to construct Genting Highlands. Its primary hill resort, Resort World Genting is currently Malaysia's only casino and highland resort. A mosque built at the hill station is named after him.

In 1970, Noah was appointed a director of MUI Group. He was appointed Chairman of the Group in 1980.

Death
Noah died on 6 September 1991 in Kuala Lumpur, at the age of 94. He was buried at Makam Pahlawan near Masjid Negara, Kuala Lumpur.

Honours
  : 
  Commander of the Order of the Defender of the Realm (PMN) – Tan Sri (1963)
  : 
  Recipient of the Malaysian Commemorative Medal (Gold) (PPM) (1965)
  :
  Second Class of the Sultan Ibrahim Medal (PIS II) (1947)
  Knight Commander Order of the Crown of Johor (DPMJ) – Dato' (1955)
  Knight Grand Commander Order of the Crown of Johor (SPMJ) – Dato' (1960)
  Knight Grand Companion of the Order of Loyalty of Sultan Ismail of Johor (SSIJ) – Dato' (1977)

Foreign honours
  : 
  Second Class of the Order of Seri Paduka Mahkota Brunei (DPMB) – Dato Paduka (1960)

See also
 Johore Bahru Timor (federal constituency)

References

1898 births
1991 deaths
People from Muar
People from Johor
Malaysian people of Bugis descent
Malaysian people of Malay descent
Malaysian Muslims
Speakers of the Dewan Rakyat
Presidents of the Dewan Negara
Members of the Dewan Rakyat
Members of the Dewan Negara
Members of the Johor State Legislative Assembly
United Malays National Organisation politicians
Commanders of the Order of the Defender of the Realm
Knights Commander of the Order of the Crown of Johor
Knights Grand Commander of the Order of the Crown of Johor